Axarquía is a  of Andalusia in southern Spain. It is the wedge-shaped area east of Málaga. Its name is traced back to Arabic  (meaning "the eastern [region]"). It extends along the coast and inland. Its coastal towns make up the Costa del Sol Oriental - one of the sunniest places in mainland Spain with the average of 320 sunny days a year. The natives of the region are called .

The  is composed of 31 municipalities, of which the capital is Vélez-Málaga. The Vélez, Algarrobo and Torrox rivers all run through the region. Its highest mountain is La Maroma, highest point of the Sierra de Tejeda, Penibaetic System.

The Axarquía  is also known as Axarquía-Costa del Sol, for it includes the  sector of the Costa del Sol, east of Málaga city made up of Rincón de la Victoria, Vélez-Málaga, Algarrobo, Torrox and Nerja municipal terms.

Etymology 
The Dictionary of the Spanish Royal Academy defines the word "jarquía" (xarquía in old Castilian) as "district or territory located east of a great city and dependent on it" and says that it proceeds from Arabic    Šarqiyya, meaning "eastern part" or " eastern." It coincides with the region of Axarquia which lies in the east of Málaga. The Royal Academy, in its spelling of the Spanish Language, 1999 edition, explains that, in old Castilian, consonant fricative phoneme  represented the palatal [ʃ] as in English sh sound, found in words like Axarquía, Don Quixote, Mexico, Texas  etc.

Municipalities

See also 
 Baetic System
 Comarcas of Andalusia

References

External links

Tejeda (La Maroma), 2.068 m
Axarquia Comarca Website

Geography of the Province of Málaga
Comarcas of Andalusia